The Bootleg Series Vol. 13: Trouble No More 1979–1981 is a set of recordings from 1979 to 1981 by Bob Dylan that showcases the music he wrote and performed during his born-again Christian period, covered in the studio albums Slow Train Coming, Saved and Shot of Love.

The 11th installment in the Bob Dylan Bootleg Series, it was released by Legacy Records on November 3, 2017, and is available in three versions: a two-disc set common to the rest of the series after the first three volumes; a four-LP album version of the standard set; and a nine-disc deluxe version with one disc a DVD. A two-disc bonus set was available initially with the deluxe version, and the standard two-disc set comprises the material on the first two discs of the deluxe set.

History
In late 1978, Dylan became a Christian. He soon began to write Christian-themed and explicitly Christian songs, which appeared on Slow Train Coming (1979), Saved (1980), and portions of Shot of Love (1981). Their religious sentiments baffled segments of Dylan's fanbase—just as Dylan's "going electric" had alienated folk purists in 1965.

Content
Trouble No More consists mostly of live recordings from this era, plus unreleased session demos and outtakes from recording sessions for the three studio albums he recorded in the period. On September 20, 2017, the song "When You Gonna Wake Up (Oslo, Norway – July 9, 1981)" was published on Dylan's YouTube channel. It was the first single from the set, which was released in a number of different editions and media formats.

The standard two-disc edition contains live versions of every song that originally appeared on the albums Slow Train Coming, Saved, and Shot of Love with the exceptions of the Porter Wagoner cover "A Satisfied Mind" on Saved and "Heart of Mine", "Property of Jesus", "Lenny Bruce", and "Trouble" from Shot of Love. Three of its songs had been previously unreleased.

The deluxe nine-disc box set duplicates the standard set for its first two discs, and includes an additional six compact discs of music plus a ninth disc containing a documentary about this period of Dylan's work on DVD. The deluxe set premiered 100 previously unreleased recordings, both live and studio, including 14 unreleased songs (with the exception of "Ye Shall Be Changed", released in 1991 on The Bootleg Series, Vol. 1–3), a 120-page photo book and extensive liner notes. The box contains over eight hours of music, and two bonus discs with the complete concert from San Diego in 1979 were included with purchase of the deluxe edition through the official Dylan website.

The DVD documentary Trouble No More: A Musical Film (US, 2017, 59 min.), is a new feature-length cinematic presentation directed by Jennifer Lebeau and Ron Kantor combining unreleased footage from Dylan's 1980 tours with new material written by Lucy Sante and performed by Academy Award nominee Michael Shannon, plus over 28 minutes of extras. The documentary premiered at the 2017 New York Film Festival.

Track listing
All tracks are written by Bob Dylan, except where indicated.

Standard two-disc edition

Deluxe box set additional discs

Limited edition exclusive bonus two-disc set

Four vinyl album edition

Collective personnel

 Bob Dylan — vocals, guitars, harmonica, piano
 Al Kooper, Spooner Oldham, Willie Smith, Terry Young – keyboards
 Steve Ripley, Carlos Santana, Fred Tackett — guitars
 Tim Drummond — bass
 Jim Keltner, Arthur Rosato – drums
 Mary Elizabeth Bridges, Carolyn Dennis, Gwen Evans, Clydie King, Regina McCrary, Regina Peebles, Helena Springs, Mona Lisa Young – backing vocals, percussion

Charts

See also
Bob Dylan bootleg recordings

References

External links
 BobDylan.com  – Official web site, including lyrics and touring schedule.

2017 compilation albums
Bob Dylan compilation albums
Columbia Records compilation albums
Demo albums
Bob Dylan video albums
Bob Dylan live albums
2017 video albums
Live video albums